Pierre Lévisse (born 21 February 1952) is a French long-distance runner. He competed in the men's 10,000 metres at the 1976 Summer Olympics.

References

1952 births
Living people
Athletes (track and field) at the 1976 Summer Olympics
French male long-distance runners
Olympic athletes of France
Place of birth missing (living people)
20th-century French people